De Lugo (of Lugo) may refer to:
j m

People with the surname de Lugo
 Álvaro Yáñez de Lugo, Spanish nobleman
 Francisco de Lugo (conquistador) (d. 1532), Spanish conquistador, son of Álvaro
 Alonso Fernández de Lugo (d. 1525), Spanish conquistador, great-nephew of Álvaro
 Pedro Fernández de Lugo (1475–1536), Spanish nobleman, son of Alonso
 Francisco Bahamonde de Lugo (d. 1574), Governor of Puerto Rico and Cartagena
 Francisco de Lugo (1580–1652) Spanish Jesuit, theologician
 John de Lugo (1583–1660), Spanish Jesuit, cardinal, brother of Francisco
 Bernardo de Lugo, Spanish linguist, friar and writer from Nueva Granada
 Carlos Benites Franquis de Lugo (b. 1691), Spanish Governor of Texas
 Ron de Lugo (b. 1930), American politician

Dukes of Lugo
 Infanta Elena, Duchess of Lugo (b. 1963), daughter of Juan Carlos I of Spain
 Jaime de Marichalar, Duke of Lugo (b. 1963), former husband of Infanta Elena

Places
Tulantepec de Lugo Guerrero, Hidalgo, Mexico

See also
Lugo (surname)